The Cuban Revolutionary Council (CRC) was a group formed, with CIA assistance, three weeks before the April 17, 1961 Bay of Pigs Invasion to "coordinate and direct" the activities of another group known as the Cuban Democratic Revolutionary Front. Both groups were composed of Cuban exiles dedicated to overthrowing Fidel Castro's communist government in Cuba.  José Miró Cardona, former Prime Minister of Cuba, was chairman of the Cuban Revolutionary Council. On its board of directors were: Antonio de Varona, Justo Carrillo, Carlos Hevia, Antonio Maceo, Manuel Ray, and Manuel Artime.  

The Bay of Pigs Invasion floundered and Miró Cardona, whose son had joined the invasion force, blamed the CIA for the failure. Miró Cardona concluded that the CIA had disregarded resistance groups within Cuba, ignored the paramilitary groups led by Manuel Ray, and misled the Cuban exiles over the role of the U.S. military in the invasion. After the October 1962 missile crisis, the Kennedy administration withdrew much of its support to the Cuban Revolutionary Council and other militant exile groups. In April 1963, Miró Cardona resigned as chairman of the CRC, claiming that Kennedy had chosen a path of peaceful coexistence with Castro's government.

In 1961–62, the New Orleans chapter of the Cuban Revolutionary Council occupied an office in the Newman Building at 544 Camp Street. This was the building where anti-Castro activist and accused JFK Assassination conspirator Guy Banister also had his office. During this period, Banister associate Sergio Arcacha Smith was the "official delegate" for the New Orleans chapter of the CRC.

See also 
 Cuban dissident movement
 Cuban Democratic Revolutionary Front

Footnotes

Aftermath of the Cuban Revolution
Paramilitary organizations based in Cuba
Opposition to Fidel Castro

Anti-communist organizations